Glyphuroplata is a genus of tortoise beetles and hispines in the family Chrysomelidae. There are at least four described species in Glyphuroplata.

Species
These four species belong to the genus Glyphuroplata:
 Glyphuroplata anisostenoides E. Riley, 1985
 Glyphuroplata nigella (Weise, 1907)
 Glyphuroplata pluto (Newman, 1841)
 Glyphuroplata uniformis (Smith, 1885)

References

Further reading

 
 
 
 

Cassidinae
Articles created by Qbugbot